EuroLeague TV is an internet specialty channel that covers the primary level European-wide men's professional club basketball league, the EuroLeague, as well as the secondary level European-wide basketball league, the EuroCup. EuroLeague TV is the official broadcaster for both leagues. The channel's commentary is in English, and the network is financially dependent on the EuroLeague, and its parent company, Euroleague Basketball.

The games are broadcast live through the internet, and can also be purchased through a yearly subscription, or one by one.

Personalities
Frank Lawlor
Andy West
Liam Canny
Johnny Rogers
George Zidek
Joe Arlauckas
Theo Papaloukas
Saša Đorđević

External links
EuroLeague TV official site
EuroLeague TV official Twitter

EuroLeague
EuroCup Basketball